Pimeliinae is a subfamily of beetles in the family Tenebrionidae.

Selected genera

  Tribus Adelostomini
 Adelostoma
 Carinosella
 Eurychora
 Prunaspila
  Tribus Adesmiini
 Adesmia
 Alogenius
 Cauricara
 Ceradesmia
 Coeladesmia
 Epiphysa
 Metriopus
 Onymacris
 Physadesmia
 Physosterna
 Renatiella
 Stenocara
 Stenodesia
  Tribus Akidini
 Akis
 Cyphogenia
 Morica
 Sarothropus
 Solskyia
  Tribus Anepsiini
 Anchoma
 Anepsius
 Batuliodes
 Batuliomorpha
 Batulius
  Tribus Asidini
 Afrasida
 Alphasida
 Andremiopsis
 Andremius
 Ardamimicus
 Asida
 Asidesthes
 Cardigenius
 Craniotus
 Euryprosternum
 Ferveoventer
 Heterasida
 Leptasida
 Litasida
 Machla
 Machleida
 Machlomorpha
 Micrasida
 Microschatia
 Oxyge
 Parecatus
 Pelecyphorus
 Prosodidius
 Pseudasida
 Scotinesthes
 Scotinus
 Stenomorpha
  Tribus Cnemeplatiini
 Actizeta
 Cnemeplatia
 Lepidocnemeplatia
 Philhammus
 Rondoniella
 Thorictosoma
 Wattiana
  Tribus Cnemodinini
 Cnemodinus
  Tribus Cryptochilini
 Calognathus
 Cerasoma
 Cryptochile
 Homebius
 Vansonium
  Tribus Cryptoglossini
 Asbolus
 Cryptoglossa
 Schizillus
  Tribus Epitragini
 Bothrotes
 Cyrtomius
 Epitragus
 Epitrichia
 Hymatismus
 Lobometopon
 Phegoneus
 Schoenicus
  Tribus Erodiini
 Ammodoides
 Ammozoides
 Ammozoum
 Amnodeis
 Anodesis
 Apantodes
 Apentanes
 Apentanodes
 Arthrodeis
 Arthrodibius
 Arthrodinus
 Arthrodion
 Arthrodosis
 Arthrodygmus
 Arthrohyalosis
 Bulbulus
 Capricephalus
 Diaphanidus
 Diodontes
 Erodiontes
 Erodius
 Falsarthrosis
 Foleya
 Globularthrodosis
 Histeromimus
 Histeromorphus
 Hyalarthrodosis
 Hyalerodius
 Iranerodius
 Leptonychoides
 Leptonychus
 Piestognathoides
 Piestognathus
 Pseudodiaphanidus
 Rasphytus
 Spyrathus
  Tribus Lachnogyini
 Lachnogya
 Netuschilia
  Tribus Nycteliini
 Auladera
 Callyntra
 Entomobalia
 Entomoderes
 Epipedonota
 Gyriosomus
 Mitragenius
 Nyctelia
 Patagonogenius
 Pilobalia
 Psectrascelis
 Scelidospecta
  Tribus Pimeliini
 Argyrophana
 Diesia
 Graecopachys
 Lasiostola
 Ocnera
 Pachyscelis
 Pimelia
 Platyesia
 Platyope
 Podhomala
 Pterocoma
 Sternoplax
 Trachyderma
 Trigonocnera
 Trigonoscelis
  Tribus Praociini
 Antofagapraocis
 Asidelia
 Falsopraocis
 Gyrasida
 Neopraocis
 Patagonopraocis
 Pilobaloderes
 Platesthes
 Praocidia
 Praocis
 Thylacoderes
  Tribus Scotobiini
 Emmallodera
 Scotobius
 Tribus Sepidiini
 Bombocnodolus
 Decoriplus
 Dichtha
 Moluris
 Tarsocnodes
 Microphligra
 Phligra
 Somaticus
 Trachynotus
  Tribus Stenosini
 Aspidocephalus
 Dichillus
 Eutagenia
 Microblemma
 Microtelus
 Nepalofranziella
 Pseudethas
 Reitterella
 Rhypasma
 Stenosis
 Tagenostola
  Tribus Tentyriini
 Anatolica
 Archinamaqua
 Calyptopsis
 Dailognatha
 Dichomma
 Eulipus
 Hegeter
 Melanochrus
 Melaxumia
 Mesostena
 Microdera
 Oxycara
 Oxycarops
 Pachychila
 Paivaea
 Psammocryptus
 Scythis
 Tentyria
 Tentyrina
  Tribus Zophosini
 Anisosis
 Calosis
 Gyrosis
 Microsis
 Occidentophosis
 Onychosis
 Zophosis

References

External links
 
 Biolib
 Bug Guide

 
Beetle subfamilies